Yingxiang (Influence Magazine) was an important film journal published in Taiwan, comparable in its significance as a platform of debate to the importance of the Cahiers du Cinéma for the French debate about film, the significance of Bianco e nero in the Italian context, the impact of Filmkritik in Germany and of  Screen for English-speaking cinema lovers.

The name
The name of the journal is sometimes translated as Impact Magazine in English language publications. Chen Xihe, for instance, gives the name as Impact magazine (影響).  Yingxiang is the correct pinyin version used in the P.R.China and internationally by Sinologists. Impact is a correct translation of 影響. But in Taiwan, 影響 is usually transliterated Yinxiang and the issues of the magazine that appeared in the 1970s featured both  and the English words Influence magazine (rather than Impact magazine)on the front cover.

Beginnings
A press report on the start of Influence film magazine  titled “Wang Hsiao-hsiang founded Yinxiang magazine” appeared on Dec. 10, 1971 in a Taipei newspaper. It is reprinted in “The Chronicle of Taiwan  Cinema 1898-2000,” a publication that consists of several volumes published by the Chinese Taipei Film Archive. The report  says that “following the example of the Theater (劇場) magazine, Influence Magazine, a professional  publication dedicated to the exploration of film, was founded today.” The press report reprinted in the book gives December 1971 as the date for the founding, while Lin Mucai writes that the magazine “was founded in 1972.” He probably refers to the date when the first issue appeared. The disagreement (December 1971 or (early?) 1972) is of course of small significance. The fact that an article reporting the founding of the magazine appeared on December 10, 1971 is of course good evidence. But it does not tell us when the first issue appeared in print.

In an interview that is summed up in a publication done for (and by) Taida alumni, Prof. Lee Daw-ming who was an editor of Yinxiang in the late 1970s, said that ",a National Taiwan University law school graduate, Zhuō Bótáng (National Chengchi University (NCCU)) and Duan Zhongyi (NCCU)… started Yinxiang Magazine (in 1972)”

In this interview, Lee Daw-ming observed that the timely convergence of several favorable conditions led to the birth of the first professional film publication. 1.) First, the United States Information Service vigorously promoted film. 2.) Wang Hsiao-hsiang came back from the United States and brought back concepts of film aesthetics, 3.) Yin Yun-peng, Lin Hwai-min and others started to teach at National Chengchi University, 4.) Tang Shu Shuen shot Mrs. Dong (1970), a film that aroused international attention. It was a time when the arts flourished, on campus it set off a craze for the movies."

The editors

Reviews
The Chronicle of Taiwan Cinema notes "In its first issue, the journal stated that film art, attaining the height of its development, became the most influential language of the 20th century. But in China, due to the producers, the government, the audience, and even multiple misunderstandings and intellectuals attacks, it presented  a distorted face. Therefore the journal will be professional, embracing an academic point of view, offering in-depth analysis oriented toward Western movies, guiding people positively and working for the development of a mature film art in the country."

Critic Chen Xihe wrote: Professor Lee Daw-ming  called Yinxiang "Taiwan's most representative film research publication" in the 1970s.

New era of Taiwan cinema
The Cinema of Taiwan which had been either very cheap and commercial or an even cheaper tool of KMT propaganda, was off to a new start. The year 1979 saw two films by Li Hsing, Story of A Small Town and Good Morning, Taipei. A year later, Hou Hsiao-hsien's first feature film, Cute Girls, was released. A good future for a serious film publication was what everyone expected.

Dissident publishing
The cultural debate and the debate focused on the need for democracy were inseparable between 1976 and 1980. It made the Kuomintang (KMT) nervous. Dissidents became active more openly than before, despite martial law. A politician of the pro-democracy movement ran for office as a non-party candidate and was elected as “magistrate” of Taoyuan. But then, things escalated. “Taoyuan's magistrate was murdered.” It was a surprise for everyone, especially for the regime, that the opposition was not intimidated at once. “In 1978, …increasingly bold demonstrations swept Taiwan.”  The conflict would lead up to the so-called Kaohsiung incident in 1979.
 
As publisher of Yinxiang, Wang Hsiao-hsiang was daring at the time. In 1978, at the height of the conflict which had begun as a controversial debate over the Taiwanese literature movement that advocated Nativist literature, Wang okayed the publication of an article about a forbidden film. The film in question was Wim Umboh’s ‘Plastic Flowers.’  At the time, Wim Umboh's film was scheduled to be screened at the 1978 Taipei Film Festival. But when the festival had already commenced, the censors suddenly determined that ‘Plastic Flowers’ could not be shown. It focused too obviously on the ‘dark sides’ of society. The Yinxiang people, above all Lee Daw-ming (who was then the editor of the journal), managed however to organize a private screening for film journalists. A German film critic, who was invited by Lee Daw-ming to see the film, interviewed Wim Umboh and wrote the film review for Yinxiang.

An abrupt end
 Yinxiang abruptly ceased operations in September 1979. Pressure exerted by the censors of the KMT's censorship and propaganda office, the G.I.O., or the voiding of its licence is a likely cause.
 In December 1979, the demonstrations in Kaohsiung led to the closing down of political magazines of the opposition, especially Meilidao 美麗島 (Formosa Magazine), and to the arrest of their editors, among them the Formosa magazine editors Shih Ming-teh and Annette Lu. The opposition magazine Qia Chao 夏潮 (China Tide Magazine, literally Summer Tide) was closed down for good already in spring, 1979, after 35 of its issues had been banned since its inception in early 1976.
 1979 was not a good year for courageous editors in Taiwan.

A  re-beginning
A new series of Yinxiang started to appear on November 20, 1989. Its publication was interrupted more than once. Martial law in Taiwan was lifted 1987. The film magazine closed permanently on December 1, 1998.

Notes

References

Further reading
 Chen Xihe, “Chinese Film Scholarship in Chinese,” in: Yingjin Zhang (ed.), A Companion to Chinese Cinema. Oxford (UK), Malden MA (Wiley Blackwell) 2012, pp. 464–484
 "", Taipei (CTFA) 2000
 Ming-Yan Lai, Nativism and Modernity: Cultural Contestations in China and Taiwan Under Global Capitalism. Albany NY (State University of New York Press) 2008

External links
 Overview of the magazine in the Encyclopedia of Taiwan 
 Interview with a former editor 
 Images of the inaugural issue 

1971 establishments in Taiwan
1998 disestablishments in Taiwan
Chinese-language magazines
Defunct magazines published in Taiwan
Film magazines
Magazines established in 1971
Magazines disestablished in 1998